The 1988 IAAF Grand Prix Final was the fourth edition of the season-ending competition for the IAAF Grand Prix track and field circuit, organised by the International Association of Athletics Federations. It was held on 13 September at the Olympiastadion in West Berlin. Saïd Aouita (5000 metres) and Paula Ivan (1500 metres) were the overall points winners of the tournament, with this being Aouita's second win at the completion following his 1986 victory.

Medal summary

Men

Women

Points leaders

Men

Women

References
IAAF Grand Prix Final. GBR Athletics. Retrieved on 2015-01-17.

External links
IAAF Grand Prix Final archive from IAAF

Grand Prix Final
International athletics competitions hosted by West Germany
IAAF Grand Prix Final
Sports competitions in West Berlin
1980s in West Berlin
Athletics in Berlin
1988 in West Germany